Kosala flavosignata is a moth of the  family Lasiocampidae. It is found in India, Vietnam and China.

References

Moths described in 1879
Lasiocampidae